CBS 19 may refer to one of the following television stations in the United States:

Currently affiliates
KEPR-TV in Pasco/Richland/Kennewick, Washington
Semi-satellite of KIMA-TV in Yakima, Washington
KYTX in Nacogdoches/Tyler, Texas
WCAV in Charlottesville, Virginia
WHNT-TV in Huntsville, Alabama
WLTX in Columbia, South Carolina
WOIO in Shaker Heights/Cleveland, Ohio
WZMQ-DT2, a digital channel of WZMQ in Marquette, Michigan

Formerly affiliated
WARD-TV/WJNL-TV 19 (now WPCW) in Johnstown-Altoona-State College, Pennsylvania (1953 to 1982)